The New Zealand Sports Hall of Fame is an organisation commemorating New Zealand's greatest sporting triumphs. It was inaugurated as part of the New Zealand sesquicentenary celebrations in 1990. Some 160 members have been inducted into the Hall of Fame since its inception representing a wide variety of sports. Inductions are held regularly every second year.

Since 1999, it has been located in Dunedin, in the city's Railway Station building, where a museum is sited displaying mementos of New Zealand's sporting achievements. Prior to this time the Hall of Fame was based in Wellington. The current chief executive of the Hall of Fame is sports writer Ron Palenski.

After September 2021 the museum could have to close or move to another city unless a new sponsor was found.

Inductees

Individuals
The following individuals have been inducted into the New Zealand Sports Hall of Fame:

Teams
The following teams have been inducted into the New Zealand Sports Hall of Fame:

References

New Zealand sports trophies and awards
Hall
All-sports halls of fame
International Sports Heritage Association
Awards established in 1990
Sports museums in New Zealand
Museums in Dunedin
Sport in Dunedin
Sports
1990 establishments in New Zealand
Central Dunedin